The Oregon Trail is a series of educational computer games. The first game was originally developed by Don Rawitsch, Bill Heinemann, and Paul Dillenberger in 1971 and produced by the Minnesota Educational Computing Consortium (MECC) in 1974. The original game was designed to teach 8th grade schoolchildren about the realities of 19th-century pioneer life on the Oregon Trail. The player assumes the role of a wagon leader guiding a party of settlers from Independence, Missouri, to Oregon's Willamette Valley via a covered wagon in 1848.

History
In 1971, Don Rawitsch, a senior at Carleton College in Northfield, Minnesota, taught an 8th grade history class as a student teacher. He used HP Time-Shared BASIC running on an HP 2100 minicomputer to write a computer program to help teach the subject. Rawitsch recruited two friends and fellow student teachers, Paul Dillenberger and Bill Heinemann, to help.

The original core gameplay concepts that have been included in every subsequent version are initial supply purchase, occasional food hunting, occasional supply purchase at forts, inventory management of supplies, variable travel speed depending upon conditions, frequent misfortunes, and game over upon death or successfully reaching Oregon.

The game that would be later named The Oregon Trail debuted to Rawitsch's class on December 3, 1971. Although the minicomputer's teletype and paper tape terminals that predate display screens were awkward to children, the game was immediately popular, and he made it available to users of the minicomputer time-sharing network owned by Minneapolis Public Schools. When the next semester ended, Rawitsch printed out a copy of the source code and deleted it from the minicomputer.

MECC
In 1974, the Minnesota Educational Computing Consortium (MECC), a state-funded organization that developed educational software for the classroom, hired Rawitsch. He uploaded the Oregon Trail game into the organization's time-sharing network by retyping it, copied from a printout of the 1971 BASIC code. Then, he modified the frequency and details of the random events that occurred in the game, to more accurately reflect the accounts he had read in the historical diaries of people who had traveled the trail. In 1975, when his updates were finished, he made the game titled OREGON available to all the schools on the timeshare network. The game became one of the network's most popular programs, with thousands of players monthly.

Rawitsch published the source code of The Oregon Trail, written in BASIC 3.1 for the CDC Cyber 70/73-26, in Creative Computings May–June 1978 issue. That year, MECC began encouraging schools to adopt the Apple II microcomputer. John Cook adapted the game for the Apple II, and it appeared on A.P.P.L.E.'s PDS Disk series No. 108. A further version called Oregon Trail 2 was adapted in June 1978 by J.P. O'Malley. The game was further released as part of MECC's Elementary series, on Elementary Volume 6 in 1980. The game was titled simply Oregon, and featured minimal graphics. It proved so popular that it was re-made under the same title, with substantially improved graphics and expanded gameplay, in 1985. The new version was also updated to more accurately reflect the real Oregon Trail, incorporating notable geographic landmarks as well as human non-player characters with whom the player can interact.

By 1995, The Oregon Trail generated about one-third of MECC's $30 million in annual revenue. An updated version, Oregon Trail Deluxe, was released for DOS and Macintosh in 1992, as well as Windows in 1993 (under the title of simply The Oregon Trail Version 1.2) followed by Oregon Trail II in 1995, The Oregon Trail 3rd Edition in 1997, and 4th and 5th editions. , more than 65 million copies of The Oregon Trail have been sold.

Editions
Games in the series were released with varying titles.

Legacy
The game was popular among American elementary school students from the mid-1980s to the mid-2000s, as many computers came bundled with the game. MECC followed up on the success of The Oregon Trail with similar titles such as The Yukon Trail and The Amazon Trail. David H. Ahl published Westward Ho!, set on the Oregon Trail in 1848, as a type-in game in 1986.

The phrase "You have died of dysentery" has been popularized on T-shirts and other promotional merchandise. Another popular phrase from the game is "Here lies andy; peperony and chease", which is a player-generated epitaph featured on an in-game tombstone saved to a frequently bootlegged copy of the game disk, and likely a direct reference to a popular Tombstone pizza television commercial from the 1990s.

The game resurfaced in 2008 when Gameloft created an updated version for cell phones. A new release for the iPhone and iPod Touch was also available from Gameloft. The game went live in the iTunes App Store on March 11, 2009. In 2010, the Palm webOS version was released to the Palm App Catalog on January 7, and Xbox Live version was released on Windows Phone 7 on November 11.

The cell phone version of the game is similar to the original, but varies in that the player can choose one of three different wagons: a basic wagon, a prairie schooner or a Conestoga wagon. The player can also choose to become a banker, a carpenter, or a farmer, each of which has unique benefits. Unlike the computer version of the game, players in the iPhone and iPod Touch version do not need to buy guns and bullets. The game has received a major update, in which the player uses trading and crafting to upgrade their wagon, buy food, and cure ailments.

In 2011, the 1975 and 1978 BASIC source code versions of the game were reconstructed.

In February 2011, a new version of the game was released on the social networking site Facebook. This version was removed from Facebook when Blue Fang Games closed. A new version of the game was also released for the Wii and 3DS that year, and received a negative critical response.

In 2012, a parody called Organ Trail was released by the Men Who Wear Many Hats for browsers, iOS, and Android, with the setting changed to human survivors fleeing a zombie apocalypse.

In 2012, the Willamette Heritage Center (WHC) and the Statesman Journal newspaper in Salem, Oregon created Oregon Trail Live as a live-action event. Teams competed through ten challenges on the grounds of the WHC. Challenges were based loosely on the game: hunting for game was done by shooting Nerf guns at college students wearing wigs and cloth antlers, while carrying  of meat became pulling a 200-pound man up a hill in a child's red wagon while he recited historical meat facts and pointed out choice cuts. Independence, Missouri, was at one end of the grounds, and the Willamette Valley was at the other end. The WHC received the 2014 Outstanding Educator Award from the Oregon-California Trails Association for this event.

In 2013, a dark comedy entitled Oregon Trail: The Play! received its first professional production by New Orleans-based theatre company The NOLA Project, and was subsequently published three years later by Alligator Pear Publishing, LLC. The play closely parodies the game, following a westward-headed family as they stock up on provisions for their oxen-led wagons and do their best to survive river crossings, illnesses, hunting, highway robbery, and a host of other mid-nineteenth-century dilemmas. Audience members are asked to help provide food for the family in a mid-play Nerf shooting gallery.

In 2014, a parody musical called The Trail to Oregon! was made by the musical theater company StarKid Productions, with several references being made towards the game.

In 2015, a 5k fun run held in Oregon City (the end of the route of the Oregon Trail) was modeled after the game with choice points along the route.

In 2016, the game was parodied in an episode of Teen Titans Go! entitled "Oregon Trail" (Season 3, Episode 48).

Also that year, Pressman Toy Corporation released The Oregon Trail card game based on the video game.

In 2018, a handheld electronic version of the game was produced by the company Basic Fun. This battery-powered version featured a small TV monitor that replicated the look and sounds of one of the older PC/Apple versions of the game.

The game was referenced on the May 2020 edition of WWE Smackdown. On that episode Otis told both John Morrison and The Miz that his usual tag team partner Tucker couldn't make it to the tag team match that night, "because he got dysentery on The Oregon Trail".

References

External links
 
 
 The Oregon Trail 1991 Macintosh edition emulated with PCE.js

 
Fiction set in 1848
Video games set in the 19th century
Houghton Mifflin Harcourt franchises
Video game franchises introduced in 1971
Video games set in Missouri
Video games set in Oregon
Western (genre) video games